Fusarium oxysporum f.sp. medicaginis is a fungal plant pathogen infecting alfalfa.

References

External links
 USDA ARS Fungal Database

oxysporum f.sp. medicaginis
Fungal plant pathogens and diseases
Forma specialis taxa